Amalda josecarlosi is a species of sea snail, a marine gastropod mollusk in the family Ancillariidae.

Description

Distribution
Trawled at depths around 60 to 80 metres, off East coast of Brazil

References

josecarlosi
Gastropods described in 2003